The Thatcher Magoun, an extreme clipper launched in 1855, was named after Medford's great shipbuilder, Thatcher Magoun, who died the year that she was launched.

In his book published in 1937, Hall Gleason comments on the appearance of Thatcher Magoun as follows: "Her figurehead was a life-like image of the father of ship building on the Mystic."

Voyages
According to Hall Gleason, Thatcher Magoun made five passages from Boston to San Francisco. For this route, the clipper's fastest journey was completed in 113 days, and its slowest in 152 days. Moreover, in 1869, Thatcher Magoun made seven passages from New York to San Francisco, averaging 96 days per voyage.

On one of its voyages from New York to San Francisco, Thatcher Magoun carried locomotives CP 88, 89, and 95 for the Central Pacific Railroad company. This voyage began July 10, 1868, and lasted 117 days.

Namesake

Thatcher Magoun established the first shipyard in Medford, MA on what is known today as Riverside Avenue, opposite the end of Park Street. In 1803, Magoun laid the keel of his first vessel, the Mt. Aetna, the model of which he had made a few years before. He continued building ships at this location until 1836; eventually his yard was to be the only one in Medford with a ship house.

Magoun amassed significant wealth by building 84 vessels over the course of his career. He specialized in big ships and brigs, which are 250 tons and larger in size, built for Old China Trade. According to the maritime historian Admiral Samuel Eliot Morison, Magoun's reputation was "second to none among American shipbuilders."

References

External links
 
The New Clipper Ship Thatcher Magoun of Boston

Individual sailing vessels
California clippers
Age of Sail merchant ships of the United States
Merchant ships of the United States
Merchant ships of Norway
Ships built in Medford, Massachusetts
1855 ships